Córdoba is a province of Argentina, located in the center of the country. Its neighboring provinces are (clockwise from the north) Santiago del Estero, Santa Fe, Buenos Aires, La Pampa, San Luis, La Rioja, and Catamarca. Together with Santa Fe and Entre Ríos, the province is part of the economic and political association known as the Center Region.

Almost 41% of its inhabitants reside in the capital city, Córdoba, and its surroundings, making it the second most populous metro area in Argentina.

History

Before the Spanish conquista the region now called Córdoba Province was inhabited by indigenous groups, most notably the Comechingones and Sanavirones.

Once settled in Alto Perú, the Spaniards searched for a route to the Río de la Plata port in the Atlantic Ocean to transport the Peruvian gold and silver to Europe.

Córdoba de la Nueva Andalucía (nowadays the city of Córdoba) was founded as a middle point on that route on July 6, 1573 by Jerónimo Luis de Cabrera.
The Colegio Convictorio de Nuestra Señora de Monserrat was founded by the Jesuits in 1599, followed by the National University of Córdoba, Argentina's first university, in 1613. The city continued to grow as an important cultural center, supported by the trade of precious metals from Peru. In 1761 a printing press was installed in the University.

In 1783, seven years after the consolidation of the Viceroyalty of the Río de la Plata, the Intendency of Córdoba became the capital of what now includes the La Rioja, Mendoza, San Juan, and San Luis Provinces, dividing the former Tucumán Intendency in two. Rafael de Sobremonte was its first governor, when Córdoba City had 38,800 inhabitants.

After the May Revolution in 1810, Governor Juan Gutiérrez de la Concha joined a meeting that decided to ignore the authority of the Buenos Aires Junta. Francisco Ortiz de Ocampo attacked the city and executed the leaders of the opposition, among whom was Santiago de Liniers, leader of the resistance during the British invasions of the Río de la Plata.

Led by Juan Bautista Bustos after 1820, Córdoba struggled for control of the nation with Buenos Aires; the United Provinces of South America had neither legislative nor executive branches at the time. Córdoba sought a federal organization of the provinces while Rivadavia pushed for a centralised government in Buenos Aires.
For 15 years, the province was submerged in internal revolts that started to stabilize in 1868 under the provisional government of Félix de la Peña.

During the presidency of Sarmiento an astronomic observatory (1871) and the Faculty of Physical Sciences and Mathematics (1873) were inaugurated.

The creation of the railways and the consequent immigration brought a second wave of population growth to Córdoba. From 1887 on, several agricultural colonies (San Francisco, Marcos Juárez, etc.) emerged, while former rest-point Fraile Muerto (Bell Ville), Ferreira (Villa María) and Los Luceros (Río Segundo), on the route to Buenos Aires, became agricultural, commercial and industrial centers, respectively.

The University Reform movement, which originated in Córdoba in 1918, was influential not only in Argentina but throughout South America. Modernization of the curricular contents and the improvement of the students' rights were the main achievements of the movement and in Córdoba, and were largely enacted by Governor Amadeo Sabattini, who became Argentina's most progressive governor at the time and enacted civil and land reforms that would later set the national standard.

After World War II, many foreign workers and workers from other provinces in Argentina were attracted to Córdoba's industrial development, led by the expansion of the car industry. It was during Arturo Frondizi's presidency (1958–1962) that most new auto industries settled in the city of Córdoba and its surroundings.

As in the rest of the country, Peronist groups emerged in 1955 following the coup that removed Juan Perón from office. These Peronist groups, together with other socialist and anarchist groups, began opposing Argentina's third military dictatorship that began in 1966. Worker and student participation in politics grew due to the widespread discontent with the appointed governor's hard-line stance, culminating in the violent May, 1969, popular revolt known as the Cordobazo. This revolt, mirrored by the Rosariazo and others in several parts of the country, undermined the power of dictator Juan Carlos Onganía and ultimately led to his ouster by more moderate military factions.

Córdoba has continued to prosper, despite left-wing violence in 1973, right-wing political interference in 1974, government atrocities in 1976–77, 1978–81 free trade policies that battered Córdoba's sizable industrial sector, the 1980s debt crisis and, the recent acute financial crisis that ended in 2002.

Geography

Córdoba, located just north of the geographical center of the nation, is Argentina's fifth-largest province. West of this chain, two valleys contain most of the tourist spots in the province: the Calamuchita valley in the south and the Punilla Valley in the north, home of scenic towns such as Villa Carlos Paz, Cosquín, La Cumbre, and La Falda.

In the northeast corner of the province, a natural depression forms an extensive salt lake called Laguna Mar Chiquita. The southeastern part of the province is home to numerous ponds, lakes, and wetlands.

The climate of the province is predominantly temperate, with some regional variations. Generally speaking, summers are hot and humid, falls are pleasant, winters are extremely dry with strong variations in temperature, and springs are windy and variable. Starting in May, rainfall is low, with less than  monthly during the winter. Frost arrives in late April in the south, and late May in the north.

The air is often humid in winter, and thick fog is very common. Snowfall is very rare, almost unheard of in the northeast, but snowstorms can occur: in 2007, between  covered a significant part of the region, and temperatures plummeted to -9 °C in most areas (16F). Spring is very variable, alternating between very intense heat waves and cool weather periods with severe thunderstorms, hail and strong winds. This climate allows eastern Córdoba to be the nation's main producer of soybeans and peanuts, and a large producer of maize and dairy products.

The foothills of the Sierras are known for their pleasant weather: summer days are slightly cooler and the air feels much dryer despite high precipitation; winters are much dryer with less fog and less wind, and more pleasant sunny days. Snowfall occurs more frequently in the sierras, but is rarely heavy due to the dryness of the air.

The weather in the Pampa de Achala is very variable because of the high altitude: generally speaking, the strong radiation provides pleasant summer afternoons, but temperatures at night can be very cold. Frost can happen throughout the year, and winters are extremely dry with nights well below . Temperatures well under  have been recorded, and snowfall is very common but in small quantities due to the lack of precipitation during the colder months. Summer thunderstorms can be very violent, bringing large hail, frequent lightning and high winds.

Fall arrives later than elsewhere, and spring arrives earlier as well. The warmer climate is excellent for the production of Mediterranean agricultural products such as figs, olives and grapes. Winters are shorter, with night temperatures similar to those further south, but with warmer days. This is the most drought-prone area of the province, with rainfall as little as  annually.

Economy 

Córdoba has the second-largest provincial economy in Argentina, behind only the Province of Buenos Aires. In 2013, Córdoba's GDP was estimated at 191.612 billion Pesos (about US$35.0934 billion) or, 55,075 pesos (about US$10,087) per capita.

As in most places, the majority of GDP is produced by services (financial, educational, medical, professional, etc.). Within this sector, major players include Deloitte, Tarjeta Naranja and Bancor (financial services providers headquartered in the provincial capital), the city's various universities, a number of public and private clinics which attract patients both domestically and internationally (medical tourism), construction and engineering companies such as Roggio and Electroingenieria, media groups (La Voz del Interior is the largest Argentine newspaper outside Buenos Aires), retail firms (such as Grupo Dinosaurio) and a large number of small partnerships operating in accounting, law, architecture, etc.
In the past, the province had significant call centers, but these have mostly been moved to lower-wage locations.

The province is among the most visited in Argentina (mostly by domestic travelers) because of its hilly landscapes, pleasant weather, "fun" reputation, and cultural offerings. In particular, cities like Villa Carlos Paz, Villa General Belgrano, Cosquín and La Cumbrecita attract a large number of tourists. This supports a large hospitality industry with hotels, restaurants, bars and resorts. Around three million tourists, both foreign and Argentinian, visit Córdoba every year. The province has 500,000 hotel beds, including hostels, tourist farms, and other types of accommodation. There are four five-star hotels, of which three are located in Córdoba City (Sheraton Cordoba Hotel, Holiday Inn, Interplaza), and one on the hills at Punilla Valley (El Castillo). Important festivities include the Cosquín National Folk Music Festival, and the Jesús María Folk and Taming Festivals.

Call centers flourished in the province in the past but have mostly been moved to lower-wage locations. They were instead replaced by service centers from technology companies, starting with Motorola several years ago, and many of these have evolved into software and technology development centers. Current players in that industry include Intel, Mercado Libre, Santex, Globant and a vast (and growing) number of small, specialized providers which have organized under the banner of the "Cordoba Technology Cluster". The capital city has been named one of Latin America's major startup ecosystems, with several active angel investors, incubators and a well-educated talent pool supported by local universities.

The installation of the Fábrica Militar de Aviones in 1927, and subsequent state-owned industries (like locomotive and train manufacturing) established Córdoba among the most important industrial centers in Argentina; the facility was purchased by Lockheed Martin in 1995 and has practically ceased production.
Beginning around 1955, foreign investment in Córdoba's automotive, agricultural machinery and food processing industries further added to its industrial profile. Currently, Renault and FIAT produce cars in the provincial capital, with additional investments underway from Nissan, Renault and Mercedes-Benz to jointly produce a pickup truck starting in 2017–2018. Volkswagen operates a large manufacturing facility which produces and exports gearboxes. In total, 250 manufacturers of either motor vehicles or auto parts operate in Córdoba, making it Argentina's "motor province". Several facilities produce agricultural machinery (tractors, harvesters, etc.) - these are often located in small and medium cities outside the capital. Chemical manufacturing is centered around Rio Tercero.

Food processing is another strength of the province, with the multinational candy and snack manufacturer Grupo Arcor headquartered in Arroyito and one of the largest oil producers in the world (Aceitera General Deheza, or AGD) headquartered in General Deheza. The cities of Villa Maria and San Francisco are major cheese production centers, while Oncativo and Colonia Caroya are known for the production of sausages and Villa General Belgrano for its beer. Historically, cheap, sweet wine was produced in the north of the province; in the last decade, a number of more sophisticated wineries have found that the province has locations with excellent climate and soil for wine production (especially in hilly areas).

Industry represents 17% of the province's income, and the energy production that supports it is based mainly on 15 hydroelectric dams (2.35 billion kW/hours a year) and the Embalse nuclear power plant (600 MWe of capacity, about 2 billion kWh, yearly).

Agriculture and livestock provide 10% of the province's output, well above the national average. The agriculture is centered on soybeans, wheat and maize, and other cereals. Cattle and sheep enjoy the grass of Córdoba's green hills. The province provides the nation with 15% of its beef production and 28% of its dairy output.

Mining includes many different minerals, and construction material such as marble and lime. Uranium is also extracted to feed Argentina's three atomic plants.

Córdoba is connected by rail with Buenos Aires, Rosario, Mendoza and Tucumán. The Ingeniero Aeronáutico Ambrosio L.V. Taravella International Airport, known as Pajas Blancas, handles international and domestic air traffic, with several daily flights to Buenos Aires and some daily flights to Santiago de Chile, Mendoza, Bariloche, Rosario, Sao Paulo, Panama City, Rio de Janeiro and Lima. Aerolineas Argentinas operates direct flights to Miami twice a week since 2015, and Avianca has obtained authorization to fly to Bogota.

Government 

Córdoba has a unicameral legislature elected by universal suffrage. Until December 2001, the legislature was bicameral (a Chamber of Deputies and a Senate), but following the 2001 constitutional reform, this division was abolished. The unified legislature is made up of 70 members: 26 elected to represent each of the provincial departments and 44 elected by the people of the province as a whole and assigned by a proportional system. The Constitution of Córdoba forms the formal law of the province.

The head of government is the governor, accompanied by a vice-governor who presides the legislature and may fill the governor's place in certain cases. Like the legislators, the governor and vice-governor are elected for a four-year term, and can be re-elected for one consecutive term.

Córdoba has long been a bastion of the centrist Radical Civic Union, but in 1999 the Justicialist José Manuel de la Sota was elected governor, succeeded by fellow Peronist Juan Schiaretti in 2007.

In Argentina, the most important law enforcement organization is the Argentine Federal Police but the additional work is carried out by the Córdoba Provincial Police.

Political divisions 

The province is divided in 26 regions, or departments, listed below with their regional capitals.

Demographics
Evolution of population:
 1778: 44,506
 1820: 85,000
 1847: 90,000
 1853: 150,000
 1869: 210,508
 1895: 351,223
 1914: 735,472
 1947: 1,497,987
 1960: 1,753,840
 1970: 2,060,065
 1980: 2,407,754
 1991: 2,766,683
 2001: 3,066,801
 2010: 3,308,876

Largest cities

See also 
List of Governors of Córdoba

References

External links

Official Executive Power Site (Spanish)
Official Legislative Power Site (Spanish)
Official Judicial Power Site (Spanish)
La Voz del Interior daily newspaper (Spanish)
La Mañana de Córdoba daily newspaper (Spanish)
El Diario del Sur de Córdoba daily newspaper edited in Villa María (Spanish)
Cordoba Regions
 Capillas y Templos de la Provincia de Córdoba - Argentina
 Tanti, en el corazón de Córdoba - Argentina
Tourism in Cordoba Argentina. (Spanish)

 
Provinces of Argentina